D 75, also known as Sheikh Rashid Road or Al Qutaeyat Road, is a road in Dubai, United Arab Emirates.  The road begins in Bur Dubai, running perpendicular to D 92 (Al Mina Road). D 75 proceeds south-eastward towards the localities of Al Mankhool, Al Karama and Al Jafilia.  The road eventually merges with Umm Hurair Road at the Al Karama Interchange. 

Important landmarks along the D 75 route include the consulate of Indonesia, Zabeel train station, Zabeel Park, Karama Shopping Centre and Karama Post Office. 

Roads in the United Arab Emirates
Transport in Dubai